John Binns (June 1914 – 6 August 1986) was a British Labour Party politician.  He was Member of Parliament for the marginal Keighley constituency from 1964 to 1970, when it was won by Conservative Joan Hall.

During the Parliamentary debate on the 1968 Race Relations Act he refused to support the government, calling the bill 'just cant and hypocrisy'.

Binns contested Keighley again in the February 1974 election for the Campaign for Social Democracy, but finished fourth behind the Liberal candidate.

References

External links 
 

1914 births
1986 deaths
Amalgamated Engineering Union-sponsored MPs
Labour Party (UK) MPs for English constituencies
UK MPs 1964–1966
UK MPs 1966–1970